KRI Teluk Sampit (515) is the fourth  in the Indonesian Navy.

Design 

She is powered by two diesel engines, with total sustained power output of  distributed in two shaft.

Teluk Sampit has a capacity of 200 troops,  of cargo (which includes 17 main battle tanks), and 2 LCVPs on davits. The ship has a complement of 90 personnel, including 13 officers.

She is armed with three single Bofors 40 mm L/70 guns, two single Rheinmettal 20 mm autocannons, and two single DShK 12.7 mm heavy machine guns.

The ship has helicopter decks in the amidships and aft for small to medium helicopter such as Westland Wasp or MBB Bo 105.

Construction and commissioning 
Teluk Sampit was built by Korea Tacoma Shipyard in Masan, ordered in June 1979. She was commissioned in June 1981.

The ship transports Bawean residents that were stranded in Gresik for two weeks as their ferry ship, KM Harapanku Mekar, was damaged by the waves around Karang Jamuang Island, 20 miles north of Gresik, due to unbalanced cargo distribution. The transportation started on 23 February 2008 from 17.45 UTC+7 by carrying 585 adult passengers and 45 children, 7 motorbikes, and vegetables. The ship is expected to arrive at Bawean Island in about 13 – 14 hours at a speed of 11 knots or 22 kilometers per hour, starting from an estimated 17.00 until 07.00 the next day.

She landed in the city of Bima on 25 January 2018 and brought students and teachers to take part in learning about the warship on 26 January 2018. Students and teachers were given lessons and directions regarding the contents of the deck of the ship.

References

Bibliography
 

Ships built by Hanjin Heavy Industries
Amphibious warfare vessels of the Indonesian Navy
Teluk Semangka-class tank landing ships
1981 ships